Eucamptognathus diversus is a species of ground beetle in the subfamily Pterostichinae. It was described by Maximilien Chaudoir in 1874.

References

Eucamptognathus
Beetles described in 1874